The Documentary Film Institute (or DOCFilm), is an independent organization within San Francisco State University that is dedicated to support non-fiction cinema by promoting documentary films and filmmakers and producing films on socially and culturally important topics which deserve wider recognition. The current director is Soumyaa Behrens. It is situated within the College of Liberal & Creative Arts at San Francisco State University, with access to a broad cross-section of educational institutions in San Francisco and the Bay Area. It is a resource for undergraduate and graduate students studying film in the area as well as faculty interested in the artistic and politic dimensions of documentary cinema.

History 

Since 2005, DocFilm has organized thematic festivals, premieres, individual film exhibitions, tributes and pre-launch activities which brought national and international films and filmmakers to a broad base of people. DocFilm promotes the work of emerging and established documentary filmmakers through tributes and annual thematic festivals. DocFilm did the west coast premiers of films like Darwin's Nightmare and Grizzly Man which later on gained worldwide recognition among the most important documentaries in recent times. 

In 2006, the Doc Film Institute launched Oscar Docs (2006–09, 2011), an annual three-day festival of the Academy Award-nominated short and feature documentaries, featuring introductions and Q&As by many of the nominated filmmakers. The event is open to general public.

In 2011, Daniel Bernardi assumed the directorship of the institute, and film critic and theoretician Bill Nichols became chair of the advisory committee.  Building on the previous work of the institute, they created an official charter, connected the Institute more firmly to the Cinema Department at San Francisco State University, and began focusing on mini-grants to student filmmakers, the production of independent documentary films and public events such as screenings, lectures and conferences

Productions 
DocFilm produces films which provide a deeper introspection of a wide range of socio-cultural topics. Institute staff work with professional filmmakers, some of whom are Cinema Department faculty at San Francisco State University. State students benefit from working as interns on these films. Its productions include the following films:

Cachao: Uno mas (2010)
Doc Film Institute's first production, this movie is a tribute to Afro-Cuban musician Israel "Cachao" López. Filmed in San Francisco, it was the result of a collaborative effort between professional filmmakers and Cinema Department students. It premiered at the San Francisco International Film Festival (2008) and was selected by festivals worldwide. In 2010 it premiered in the PBS series "American Masters".

Chang Dai-chien in California (2011)
This 23-minute film pays tribute to the 20th-century Chinese master painter Chang Dai-chien. The painter was filmed by Art historian Michael Sullivan in 1967. This footage was acquired by San Francisco State University who used the footage to create the documentary.

God Willing (in development)
The upcoming feature-length document God Willing focuses on the lives of five Iraqi soldiers - one woman and four men - fighting with allied forces.

Education 

DocFilm offers master classes, production internships, seminars and mentoring to students and audiences at large.
Renowned filmmakers like Francis Ford Coppola, Ken Burns, Bertrand Tavernier, D.A. Pennebaker, Richard Leacock, Jean-Pierre Jeunet, Christopher Hampton and Hubert Sauper, have presented master classes for San Francisco State University students, sharing their inspirations, experiences, creative process and gave advice on pertinent issues of making films. Some of the classes were videotaped and will be available on the DocFilm  website soon.

Doc Film Institute is currently cataloging and reorganizing its documentary collection to make it part of the Cinema Department's new Media Library, thus giving the students access to a vast array of the best documentary films of the last decades. 

Students can also benefit from Doc Film's Internship program, which allows them to become involved with professional filmmakers as well as general production experience and event coordination.

External links
 Doc Film Institute Website
 SF State Cinema Department
 SF State Education
 Genius of Chang Dai Chien Documentary
 Life after life Documentary

Notes

References
 Doc Film Institute 
 Cachao:Uno Mas
 Cachao:Uno Mas on PBS 
 Cachao:Uno Mas SFIFF premiere 
 Cachao article in San Francisco Chronicle
 Cachao review in Variety
 The War with Ken Burns
 Witness to War  Film Festival.Open Source Magazine. 02/16/07
 Veteran Film Producer Named Dean of School of Film and Television. Newsroom. 05/06/10 
 Oscar Docs 2009
 Leacock Pennebaker Tribute event in SF 360
 Green Screen Festival on SF Station

San Francisco State University